Chalcides is a genus of skinks (family Scincidae).

It is usually placed in the subfamily Scincinae (= Scincidae sensu Hedges 2014), a monophyletic clade of primarily African skinks.

Species
The following species are recognized as being valid.
Chalcides armitagei  – Armitage's cylindrical skink
Chalcides bedriagai  – Bedriaga's skink
Chalcides bottegi  – Bottego's cylindrical skink, ocellated skink
Chalcides boulengeri  – Boulenger's feylinia, Boulenger's wedge-snouted skink
Chalcides chalcides  – cylindrical skink, Italian three-toed skink
Chalcides coeruleopunctatus  – La Gomera skink
Chalcides colosii  – Colosi's cylindrical skink
Chalcides delislei  – Delisle's wedge-snouted skink
Chalcides ebneri  – Ebner's cylindrical skink
Chalcides guentheri  – Günther's cylindrical skink
Chalcides lanzai  – Lanza's skink
Chalcides levitoni  – Leviton's cylindrical skink
Chalcides manueli  – Manuel's skink
Chalcides mauritanicus  – two-fingered skink
Chalcides mertensi  – Algerian three-toed skink
Chalcides minutus  – small three-toed skink
Chalcides mionecton  – Mionecton skink, Morocco cylindrical skink
Chalcides montanus 
Chalcides ocellatus  – eyed skink, gongilo, ocellated skink
Chalcides parallelus  – Chafarinas's skink
Chalcides pentadactylus  – five-fingered skink
Chalcides polylepis  – many-scaled cylindrical skink
Chalcides pseudostriatus  – Moroccan three-toed skink
Chalcides pulchellus  – Mocquard's cylindrical skink
Chalcides ragazzii  – Ragazzi's cylindrical skink
Chalcides sepsoides  – wedge-snouted skink
Chalcides sexlineatus  – Gran Canaria skink
Chalcides simonyi  – East Canary skink, Fuerteventura skink
Chalcides sphenopsiformis  – Duméril's wedge-snouted skink
Chalcides striatus  – western three-toed skink
Chalcides thierryi  – Thierry's cylindrical skink
Chalcides viridanus  – Canaryan cylindrical skink, East Canary Islands skink, Tenerife skink, West Canary skink

Nota bene: In the above list, a binomial authority in parentheses indicates that the species was originally described in a genus other than Chalcides.

References

Further reading
 (2006). "Using ancient and recent DNA to explore relationships of extinct and endangered Leiolopisma skinks (Reptilia: Scincidae) in the Mascarene islands". Molecular Phylogenetics and Evolution 39 (2): 503–511.  (HTML abstract)
 (2014). "The high-level classification of skinks (Reptilia, Squamata, Scincomorpha)". Zootaxa 3765 (4): 317–338.  
 (1768). Specimen medicum, exhibens synopsin reptilium emendatam cum experimentis circa venena et antidota reptilium austriacorum. Vienna: "Joan. Thom. Nob. de Trattnern". 214 pp. + Plates I–V. (Chalcides, new genus, p. 64). (in Latin).

 
Taxa named by Josephus Nicolaus Laurenti
Lizard genera